Desmonema may refer to:
 Desmonema (jellyfish), a genus of jellyfishes in the family Cyaneidae
 Desmonema, a genus of plants generally considered synonymous with Euphorbia